Stefan Asenov Genov (Bulgarian: Стефан Асенов Генов) (born 23 June 1956) is a Bulgarian football manager. In his career, he has managed Lokomotiv Sofia, Lokomotiv Plovdiv, and Cherno More.

Manager career
Genov started his career as manager at age of 20 as manager of Torpedo. He was later manager of Slanchev Bryag and Minyor Rudozem, before joining Lokomotiv Plovdiv  youth teams, where he managed different teams for 24 years. After that for 5 years he managed teams in Syria. In 2012, he became champion with Al-Ittihad Aleppo and led Al-Taliya in AFC Champions League. He joined again Lokomotiv Plovdiv youth academy, before becoming caretaker manager of the first team in 2009. In 2010, he became manager of Cherno More and led the team until 24 September 2012.

On 5 August 2013 he was announced as manager of Lokomotiv Sofia. From 2014 he served as assistant manager of Georgi Dermendzhiev in Ludogorets Razgrad.

Managerial statistics

References

Living people
1956 births
Bulgarian football managers
Bulgarian expatriate football managers
PFC Cherno More Varna managers
FC Lokomotiv 1929 Sofia managers
PFC Lokomotiv Plovdiv managers
PFC Pirin Blagoevgrad managers
Expatriate football managers in Syria
Bulgarian expatriates in Syria
FC Montana managers